Maria of Habsburg may refer to:
 Mary of Austria (1505-1558), queen consort of the king of Hungary and Bohemia
 Maria of Austria (1531-1581), daughter of Ferdinand I
 Archduchess Maria Theresia of Austria (1762-1770), daughter of emperor Joseph II
 Archduchess Maria Theresia of Austria (1684-1696), daughter of emperor Leopold I
 Maria Anna of Austria (1718-1744), archduchess of Austria

Other people named Maria or Mary in the house of Habsburg:

 Maria of Spain (1528–1603), wife of emperor Maximillian II
 Maria Theresa of Austria (1717–1780), Archduchess of Austria
 Maria Christina of Austria (1858–1929), queen of Spain
 Marie Antoinette (1755–1793), queen of France